Santiago Ponzinibbio (born September 26, 1986) is an Argentine mixed martial artist competing as a Welterweight in the Ultimate Fighting Championship (UFC).

Background
He was born in Argentina to parents of Italian heritage, with paternal grandparents from Sicily. Ponzinibbio began training kickboxing when he was 13 years old growing up in Argentina. Ponzinibbio became interested in MMA, but there were too few local gyms in which he could pursue it. As a result, Ponzinibbio traveled to Florianópolis, Brazil, where he lived the first five months in a tent on a beach, doing some odd jobs to try make ends meet. Meanwhile, he trained at several nearby gyms. He turned professional in 2008 competing in regional promotions in South America.

Mixed martial arts career

Early career
Ponzinibbio racked a record of 18–1 in the Latin America regional circuit before trying out for The Ultimate Fighter: Brazil 2.

The Ultimate Fighter: Brazil
In March 2013, it was revealed that Ponzinibbio was a cast member of The Ultimate Fighter: Brazil 2. He won his elimination fight to get into the TUF house, defeating Thiago Silva by TKO in round 1. He was the second pick for Team Nogueira. Over the course of the show, Ponzinibbio defeated Marcio Santos by TKO and Cleiton Duarte by unanimous decision to reach the semifinals. In the semifinals, he defeated Leonardo Santos by unanimous decision. However, Ponzinibbio broke his hand during this semifinal fight and was replaced by Santos in the finals against William Macário. The semifinal-round fight with Santos, however, was picked as the Fight of the Season, and his finish of Marcio Santos earned Knockout of the Season which earned Ponzinibbio $50,000 bonuses.

Ultimate Fighting Championship
Ponzinibbio faced Ryan LaFlare on November 9, 2013, at UFC Fight Night 32. LaFlare won the fight via unanimous decision.

Ponzinibbio was briefly linked to a bout with Jordan Mein on April 19, 2014, at UFC on Fox 11. However, Ponzinibbio was removed from the bout and replaced by Hernani Perpetuo.

Ponzinibbio was expected to face Ildemar Alcântara on July 5, 2014, at UFC 175.  However, Ponzinibbio was forced out of the bout with a knee injury. He was replaced by Kenny Robertson.

Ponzinibbio was expected to face Sérgio Moraes on September 13, 2014, at UFC Fight Night 51.  However, Moraes pulled out of the bout citing a lingering knee injury and was replaced by Wendell Oliveira.  Ponzinibbio defeated Oliveira by TKO in the first round.

Ponzinibbio faced Sean Strickland on February 22, 2015, at UFC Fight Night 61.  Ponzinibbio won the back and forth fight via unanimous decision.

Ponzinibbio next faced Lorenz Larkin on June 27, 2015, at UFC Fight Night 70. He lost the fight via TKO in the second round and earned a Fight of the Night bonus.

Ponzinibbio faced Andreas Ståhl on December 10, 2015, at UFC Fight Night 80. He won the bout via TKO in the first round.

Ponzinibbio faced Court McGee on April 16, 2016, at UFC on Fox 19. He won the bout via TKO in the first round.

Ponzinibbio next faced Zak Cummings on August 6, 2016, at UFC Fight Night 92. He won the fight via unanimous decision.

Ponzinibbio faced Nordine Taleb on February 19, 2017, at UFC Fight Night 105. He won the fight by unanimous decision.

Ponzinibbio faced Gunnar Nelson on July 16, 2017, at UFC Fight Night 113. He won the fight by knockout in the first round, becoming the first man to finish Nelson by knockout in MMA competition. The win also earned him his first Performance of the Night bonus award. At the post fight press conference, Nelson claimed that Ponzinibbio poked him in the eye during an earlier exchange and caused him to see double, stating “I really should have said something because I was seeing double for the rest of the fight. He caught me with a shot that I didn’t really see.” Ponzinibbio dismissed Nelson's claim and stated "I went there to knock him out and thank God it went as expected, I won by knockout. If (the eye poke) happened, of course it wasn’t intentional, but I watched the video again and didn’t see it."

Ponzinibbio faced Mike Perry on December 16, 2017, at UFC on Fox: Lawler vs. dos Anjos. He won the fight by unanimous decision.

Ponzinibbio was expected to face Kamaru Usman on May 19, 2018, at UFC Fight Night 129. However, on April 21, 2018, Ponzinibbio announced he was injured and  pulled from the card.

Ponzinibbio faced Neil Magny on November 17, 2018, at UFC Fight Night 140. He won the fight via knockout. This win earned him the Performance of the Night award.

Ponzinibbio was expected to face Robbie Lawler on December 14, 2019, at UFC 245. However, on October 12, 2019, it was revealed that Ponzinibbio had pulled out of the fight due to a staph infection.

Ponzinibbio was scheduled to face Muslim Salikhov on January 16, 2021, at UFC on ABC 1. However, Salikhov pulled out of the bout in mid-December citing health issues after contracting COVID-19. However, Li Jingliang stepped in as a replacement on short notice and the two fought at UFC on ABC 1. Ponzinibbio lost the fight via first-round knockout.

Ponzinibbio faced Miguel Baeza on June 5, 2021, at UFC Fight Night: Rozenstruik vs. Sakai. He won the back-and-forth fight via unanimous decision. This bout earned him the Fight of the Night award.

Ponzinibbio faced Geoff Neal on December 11, 2021, at UFC 269. He lost the back-and-forth bout via split decision. 10 out of 14 media scores gave it to Neal.

Ponzinibbio faced Michel Pereira on May 21, 2022 at UFC Fight Night 206. He lost the fight via split decision. This fight earned him the Fight of the Night award.

Ponzinibbio was scheduled to face Robbie Lawler on December 10, 2022, at UFC 282. However, the week of the event, Lawler was forced to withdraw due to an undisclosed injury. He was replaced by Alex Morono at a catchweight of 180 pounds. Ponzinibbio won the fight via technical knockout.  This win earned him the Performance of the Night award.

Ponzinibbio is scheduled to face Kevin Holland on Apr 8, 2023, at UFC 287.

Championships and accomplishments
Ultimate Fighting Championship
Fight of the Night (Three Times) 
Performance of the Night (Three times) 
MMAjunkie.com
2021 June Fight of the Month vs. Miguel Baeza
2022 May Fight of the Month

Mixed martial arts record

|- 
|Win
|align=center|29–6
|Alex Morono
|KO (punches)
|UFC 282
|
|align=center|3
|align=center|2:29
|Las Vegas, Nevada, United States
|
|-
|Loss
|align=center|28–6
|Michel Pereira
|Decision (split)
|UFC Fight Night: Holm vs. Vieira
|
|align=center|3
|align=center|5:00
|Las Vegas, Nevada, United States
|
|-
|Loss
|align=center|28–5
|Geoff Neal
|Decision (split)
|UFC 269
|
|align=center|3
|align=center|5:00
|Las Vegas, Nevada, United States
|
|-
|Win
|align=center|28–4
|Miguel Baeza
|Decision (unanimous)
|UFC Fight Night: Rozenstruik vs. Sakai
|
|align=center|3
|align=center|5:00
|Las Vegas, Nevada, United States
|
|-
|Loss
|align=center|27–4
|Li Jingliang
|KO (punch)
|UFC on ABC: Holloway vs. Kattar 
|
|align=center|1
|align=center|4:25
|Abu Dhabi, United Arab Emirates
|
|-
|Win
|align=center|27–3
|Neil Magny
|KO (punch)
|UFC Fight Night: Magny vs. Ponzinibbio 
|
|align=center|4
|align=center|2:36
|Buenos Aires, Argentina
|
 |- 
|Win
|align=center|26–3
|Mike Perry
|Decision (unanimous)
|UFC on Fox: Lawler vs. dos Anjos 
|
|align=center|3
|align=center|5:00
|Winnipeg, Manitoba, Canada
|
|-
|Win
|align=center|25–3
|Gunnar Nelson
|KO (punches)
|UFC Fight Night: Nelson vs. Ponzinibbio 
|
|align=center|1
|align=center|1:22
|Glasgow, Scotland
|
|-
|Win
|align=center|24–3
|Nordine Taleb
|Decision (unanimous)
|UFC Fight Night: Lewis vs. Browne
|
|align=center|3
|align=center|5:00
|Halifax, Nova Scotia, Canada
|
|-
|Win
|align=center|23–3
|Zak Cummings 
|Decision (unanimous)
|UFC Fight Night: Rodríguez vs. Caceres 
|
|align=center|3
|align=center|5:00
|Salt Lake City, Utah, United States
|
|-
|Win
|align=center|22–3
|Court McGee
|TKO (punches)
|UFC on Fox: Teixeira vs. Evans
|
|align=center|1
|align=center|4:15
|Tampa, Florida, United States
| 
|-
|Win
|align=center|21–3
|Andreas Ståhl
|TKO (punches)
|UFC Fight Night: Namajunas vs. VanZant
|
|align=center|1
|align=center|4:25
|Las Vegas, Nevada, United States
|    
|-
|Loss
|align=center|20–3
|Lorenz Larkin
| TKO (punches)
|UFC Fight Night: Machida vs. Romero
|
|align=center| 2
|align=center| 3:07
|Hollywood, Florida, United States
|
|- 
|Win
|align=center|20–2
|Sean Strickland
|Decision (unanimous)
|UFC Fight Night: Bigfoot vs. Mir
|
|align=center|3
|align=center|5:00
|Porto Alegre, Brazil
|
|-
|Win
|align=center|19–2
|Wendell Oliveira
|KO (punches)
|UFC Fight Night: Bigfoot vs. Arlovski
|
|align=center|1
|align=center|1:20
|Brasília, Brazil
|
|-
|Loss
|align=center|18–2
|Ryan LaFlare
|Decision (unanimous)
|UFC Fight Night: Belfort vs. Henderson 2
|
|align=center|3
|align=center|5:00
|Goiânia, Brazil
| 
|-
|Win
|align=center|18–1
|Cleiton Duarte
|Submission (guillotine choke)
|Sao Jose Super Fight 2
|
|align=center|1
|align=center|2:38
|São José, Brazil
| 
|-
|Win
|align=center|17–1
|Sebastian Vidal
|TKO (punches)
|Insano Empalux - Grand Prix
|
|align=center|1
|align=center|2:12
|São José, Brazil
| 
|-
|Win
|align=center|16–1
|Diego Vieria
|Submission (armbar)
|Insano Empalux - Grand Prix
|
|align=center|1
|align=center|1:59
|São José, Brazil
| 
|-
|Win
|align=center|15–1
|William Dias
|TKO (retirement)
|Monster Black Combat
|
|align=center|2
|align=center|5:00
|Rio Grande, Brazil
|
|-
|Win
|align=center|14–1
|Sebastian Vidal
|TKO (punches)
|Sao Jose Super Fight 2
|
|align=center|1
|align=center|2:00
|São José, Brazil
|
|-
|Win
|align=center|13–1
|Lucas Nascimento
|TKO (knee injury)
|Nitrix Champion Fight 8
|
|align=center|1
|align=center|1:30
|Joinville, Brazil
|
|-
|Win
|align=center|12–1
|Deivid Santos
|KO (head kick)
|Nitrix Champion Fight 8
|
|align=center|3
|align=center|0:15
|Joinville, Brazil
|
|-
|Loss
|align=center|11–1
|Leonardo Mafra
|TKO (punches)
|Centurion Mixed Martial Arts 2
|
|align=center| 1
|align=center| 3:17
|Itajai, Brazil
| 
|-
|Win
|align=center|11–0
|Geverson Pereira 
|Submission (choke) 
|Brazilian Fight League 9
|
|align=center|1
|align=center|N/A
|Curitiba, Brazil
|
|-
|Win
|align=center|10–0
|Yuri Fraga
|Decision (unanimous)
|Amazon Fight 5
|
|align=center|3
|align=center|5:00
|Belém, Brazil
|
|-
|Win
|align=center| 9–0
|Felipe Santos
|TKO (punches)
|Expo Fighting Championship
|
|align=center|1
|align=center|4:25
|Sorocaba, Brazil
|
|-
|Win
|align=center|8–0
|Henrique Inseto
|TKO (punches)
|Hero Kombat
|
|align=center|2
|align=center|4:53
|São Sebastião, Brazil
|
|-
|Win
|align=center|7–0
|Ezequiel Ricci
|Decision (unanimous)
|Real Fights 7
|
|align=center|3
|align=center|5:00
|Buenos Aires, Argentina
|
|-
|Win
|align=center| 6–0
|Andrez Jimenez
|Submission (rear-naked choke)
|Argentina Fighting Championships
|
|align=center|1
|align=center|3:12
|Buenos Aires, Argentina
|
|-
|Win
|align=center| 5–0
|Diego Lopez
|Submission (guillotine choke)
|Explosion Fight Night
|
|align=center|1
|align=center|2:31
|Buenos Aires, Argentina
|
|-
|Win
|align=center| 4–0
|Matias Sosa 
|Submission (kimura)
|Real Fights 6
|
|align=center|1
|align=center|N/A
|Buenos Aires, Argentina
|
|-
|Win
|align=center| 3–0
|Emiliano Candau
|TKO (punches)
|Cupide del MMA 2
|
|align=center|2
|align=center|3:12
|Santa Fe, Argentina
|
|-
|Win
|align=center| 2–0
|Lucas Funes
|Submission (rear-naked choke)
|Cupide del MMA 1
|
|align=center|1
|align=center|1:30
|Santa Fe, Argentina
|
|-
|Win
|align=center| 1–0
|Gaston Micucci
|KO (head kick)
|Copa Desafio
|
|align=center|3
|align=center|3:13
|Buenos Aires, Argentina
|
|-
|}

| Win
| align=center| 4–0
| Leonardo Santos
| Decision (unanimous)
| rowspan=4|The Ultimate Fighter: Brazil 2
| N/A(airdate)
| align=center| 3
| align=center| 5:00
| rowspan=4|São Paulo, Brazil
| 
|-
| Win
| align=center| 3–0
| Cleiton Duarte
| Decision (unanimous)
|N/A (airdate)
| align=center| 2
| align=center| 5:00
| 
|-
| Win
| align=center| 2–0
| Márcio Santos
| TKO (punches)
| N/A (airdate)
| align=center| 3
| align=center| 5:00
| 
|-
| Win
| align=center| 1–0
| Thiago Silva
| TKO (punches)
|  (airdate)
| align=center| 2
| align=center| N/A
|

See also
 List of current UFC fighters
 List of male mixed martial artists

References

External links

1986 births
Argentine expatriate sportspeople in Brazil
Sportspeople from La Plata
Welterweight mixed martial artists
Mixed martial artists utilizing kickboxing
Mixed martial artists utilizing Brazilian jiu-jitsu
Living people
Argentine male mixed martial artists
Argentine practitioners of Brazilian jiu-jitsu
People awarded a black belt in Brazilian jiu-jitsu
Ultimate Fighting Championship male fighters